Herbert Parsons may refer to:

J. Herbert Parsons (1863–1957), British ophthalmologist
Herbert Parsons (New York politician) (1869–1925) Republican representative
Herbert Angas Parsons (1872–1945), South Australian lawyer, politician and judge
Herbert Parsons (cricketer) (1875–1937), Australian cricket player for Victoria